Ihor Khudobyak may refer to:

Ihor Khudobyak (footballer, born 1985), Ukrainian footballer
Ihor Khudobyak (footballer, born 1987), Ukrainian footballer